Atossa (550 BC–475 BC) was an Achaemenid empress and daughter of Cyrus the Great and Cassandane.

Atossa may also refer to:

Objects
 810 Atossa, an asteroid belonging to the Flora family in the Main Belt

Medicines
 Ondansetron, a medicine used against nausea and vomiting

People
 Atossa Leoni (born 1978) German-born film, television, and theater actress
 Atossa Araxia Abrahamian, Swiss-American journalist

Taxonomy
 Atossa, a synonym of the genus Vicia, of the legume family (Fabaceae)
 Atossa, a synonym of the genus Nossa, of the oriental swallowtail moth family (Epicopeiidae)
 Atossa, a synonym of the genus Grammoechus, longhorn beetles of the subfamily Lamiinae